"" (We should praise Christ beautifully) is a Lutheran Christmas hymn with a text by Martin Luther, first published in 1524 in the Erfurt Enchiridion. He wrote it based on the Latin A solis ortus cardine and kept its melody (Zahn No. 297a–b).

A variant of the hymn tune, Zahn No. 297c, was published in 1535. The hymn was used in several musical settings, including the chorale cantata by Johann Sebastian Bach, Christum wir sollen loben schon, BWV 121. Bach wrote an organ chorale prelude BWV 611 for his Orgelbüchlein.

The tune is also used for "From East to West, from Shore to Shore."

See also 

 List of hymns by Martin Luther

Notes

References

Literature 

 Wilhelm Lucke: Christum wir sollen loben schon. In: D. Martin Luthers Werke. Kritische Gesamtausgabe, vol 35, Weimar 1923, S. 150–151
 Ingeborg Weber-Kellermann: Das Buch der Weihnachtslieder. Atlantis-Musikbuch-Verlag, Zürich 2003 (1982), .

External links 
 BWV 121.6 bach-chorales.com

16th-century hymns in German
Hymn tunes
Hymns by Martin Luther
1524 works
German-language Christmas carols